Ben Cosgrove (born 30 January 1988) is an American composer and multi-instrumentalist from Methuen, Massachusetts, whose work explores the intersection of sound and place.

Releases and recognition
His 2011 album, Yankee Division, is based on landscapes around New England, taking its name from the Yankee Division Highway. In 2014, he released Field Studies, an album exploring the wider American landscape, from the Sierra Nevada to the Everglades. In 2015, Cosgrove released a live album, Solo Piano, which features recordings collected from performances in thirteen different states. His 2017 studio album, Salt, is a concept record comparing landscapes of flux and ambiguity to personal tumult and emotional unrest.

In February 2021, he announced a new album, The Trouble With Wilderness, to be released in April of that year, and its lead single, "The Machine in the Garden." The album is said to focus on the built environment and everyday landscapes instead of remote or exotic places. Cosgrove told WBUR that "a lot of the album is abstractly about how there's still so much room for unpredictability, wildness and expression even within structures and situations that might seem rigid and artificial."

In addition to his solo work, he often tours and records with other artists, including The Ghost of Paul Revere and Darlingside.

Cosgrove's landscape compositions are discussed in Conor Knighton's Leave Only Footprints (2020) and Matthew Doucet's You've Never Heard Your Favorite Song: 100 Deep Cuts to Make Your World Sound Better (2020). He has served as an artist-in-residence with the Schmidt Ocean Institute, the New England National Scenic Trail, the Signet Society, Isle Royale National Park, Acadia National Park, and White Mountain National Forest.

Literature
Cosgrove also writes nonfiction essays that touch upon place, sound, and art. His writing has appeared in Orion, Northern Woodlands, and other outlets.

References

1988 births
American multi-instrumentalists
New-age musicians
Living people
Harvard College alumni